The Frog Museum is in Newmünchenstein, a sub-district of Münchenstein, in the canton of Basel-Country in Switzerland. It is dedicated to frogs.

History
The Frog Museum was privately founded in Basel in 1981/82 by Elfi and Rolf Rindlisbacher with about 500 exhibits.

In 1992 the museum moved from Basel to Münchenstein with 5000 frog objects and installed a modern and larger museum (100 m2) in the building of the Handwerkstadt, a commercial centre for craft works. In 1993 the collection had grown so big that it was rewarded with an inclusion in Guinness World Records. In 1994 the museum was enlarged again (150 m2).

The Frog Museum now has more than 13,600 exhibits of different shapes, sizes, and materials.

References

External links 
 Froschmuseum Münchenstein

Münchenstein
Museums in Basel-Landschaft